The World Light Heavyweight Championship was the first recognized professional wrestling world light heavyweight championship created in 1905

Title history

See also
World Light Heavyweight Championship (Australian version)
World Light Heavyweight Championship (National Wrestling Association)

References

External links
World Light Heavyweight Championship at Wrestling-Titles.com

World professional wrestling championships
Light heavyweight wrestling championships